Poveste de cartier (English: "Neighborhood story") is a 2008 Romanian musical romantic drama film directed by Theodor Halacu-Nicon. It stars Sorinel Copilul de Aur, Monica Merișan, Augustin Viziru, Octavian Strunilă, Florin Călinescu, Violeta Andrei, Ion Besoiu, Romică Țociu and Cornel Palade. Inspired by West Side Story, it tells the love story of Vio (Copilul de Aur) and Ramona (Merișan) who are members of two rival gangs in Pantelimon, Bucharest. The music of Poveste de cartier was composed by Dan Bursuc and belongs to the manele genre.

Cast
 Sorinel Copilul de Aur - Vio
 Monica Merișan - Ramona
 Augustin Viziru - Nic
 Octavian Strunilă - Calu
 Florin Călinescu - Davinci
 Romică Țociu - Italianu
 Cornel Palade - Vrăjitoru
 Ion Besoiu - Nea Petrică
 Violeta Andrei - Venezuela
 Sergiu Nicolaescu - Aristide
 Constantin Dinulescu - Mayor
 Paul Chiribuță - Englezu
 Vali Rupiță - Davinci's gorilla
 Virgil Constantin - Titi Doinaș
 Emilia Dobrin - Tatiana Doinaș
 Andreea Doinea - Marcela
 Adriana Nicolae - Paula

References

External links 
 

2000s romantic musical films
2000s musical drama films
2008 romantic drama films
2008 films
Romanian musical drama films
Romanian romantic drama films
Films set in Bucharest
2000s Romanian-language films